James Edward Yarbrough (born November 20, 1963) is a former American football defensive back who played for the New York Giants of the National Football League (NFL). He played college football at Murray State University.

References 

Living people
1963 births
American football defensive backs
Murray State Racers football players
New York Giants players